{{DISPLAYTITLE:C5H10O2}}
The molecular formula C5H10O2 (molar mass: 102.13 g/mol) may refer to:

 tert-Butyl formate
 Ethyl propionate
 Hydroxypivaldehyde
 Isobutyl formate
 Isopropyl acetate
 Methylbutanoic acids
 2-Methylbutanoic acid
 3-Methylbutanoic acid (isovaleric acid)
 Methyl butyrate
 Methyl isobutyrate
 Pivalic acid
 Propyl acetate
 Tetrahydrofurfuryl alcohol
 Valeric acid